Kalogiros (Greek: Καλόγηρος) is a small island of the Echinades (Drakoneres subgroup), among the Ionian Islands group of Greece. , it had no resident population.

References

External links
Kalogiros on GTP Travel Pages (in English and Greek)

Echinades
Islands of the Ionian Islands (region)
Islands of Greece
Landforms of Cephalonia